The Minister for Tourism is a position in the Cabinet of Western Australia, first created in 1959 during the Brand–Watts Ministry under the title Minister for Tourists. The current title was adopted in 1971.

The current Minister for Tourism is Roger Cook of the Labor Party. The minister, who has generally held other portfolios in addition to tourism, is responsible for Tourism Western Australia (previously the Western Australian Tourism Commission), the state government agency responsible for promoting Western Australia as a holiday destination and as an events venue.

List of Ministers for Tourism
Twenty four people have been appointed as Minister for Tourism or equivalent. The inaugural minister, Sir David Brand, was also the longest-serving minister, serving for 11 years and 335 days. He was also premier during his time as tourism minister, which has since also occurred with Brian Burke, Richard Court, and Colin Barnett. Barnett was briefly minister during the Court–Cowan government, from 1993 to 1994, and then served twice as minister during his own government (briefly in 2013 and then from 2016), a gap of almost 20 years. Pam Beggs and Kim Hames also served non-consecutive terms as minister.

In the table below, members of the Legislative Council are designated "MLC". All others were members of the Legislative Assembly at the time of their service. In Western Australia, serving ministers are entitled to be styled "The Honourable", and may retain the style after three years' service in the ministry.

List of assistant Ministers for Tourism
Ian Laurance was assistant minister to Ray O'Connor and Peter Jones during the last years of the Court government, led by Sir Charles Court. O'Connor and Jones both held multiple other portfolios.

See also
 Minister for Citizenship and Multicultural Interests (previously the Minister for Immigration)

References

Tourism
Ministers, Tourism
Tourism in Western Australia